Specklinia acrisepala is a species of orchid plant native to Costa Rica and Panama.

References 

acrisepala
Flora of Costa Rica
Flora of Panama